Lulu McClatchy is an Australian actress and comedian.

Career 
McClatchy started to write and perform her own shows at the Edinburgh Festival. She created the comedy show Supergirly and went on to present a slot on Live & Kicking. She also performed in her own sitcom, as well as performing with Elton John in the Australian leg of his 2002 tour. Supergirly also appeared at Just for Laughs in Montreal as well as a tour of the U.S. and Canada with host Harland Williams.

In 2005, McClatchy joined the cast of Neighbours as Genevieve "Eva" Doyle. She also plays the role of Bonnie in the film Aquamarine and Aunt Cassandra in Bogan Pride.

Filmography

Film

Television

External links

personal site
writing/producing site

Australian women comedians
Australian film actresses
Australian television actresses
Living people
Year of birth missing (living people)
Place of birth missing (living people)